Qizhou or Qi Prefecture was a zhou (prefecture) in imperial China centering on modern Anguo, Hebei, China. It existed from 893 until 1913.

Geography
The administrative region of Qizhou in the Tang dynasty is in central Hebei. It probably includes parts of modern: 
Under the administration of Baoding:
Anguo
Dingzhou
Under the administration of Shijiazhuang:
Shenze County
Jinzhou
Wuji County

References
 

Prefectures of Later Han (Five Dynasties)
Prefectures of the Tang dynasty
Prefectures of Later Tang
Prefectures of the Jin dynasty (1115–1234)
Prefectures of Later Jin (Five Dynasties)
Prefectures of the Song dynasty
Prefectures of the Yuan dynasty
Subprefectures of the Ming dynasty
Departments of the Qing dynasty
Former prefectures in Hebei
Prefectures of Later Zhou